The 2018–19 Coupe de France preliminary rounds, Grand Est was the qualifying competition to decide which teams from the leagues of the Grand Est region of France took part in the main competition from the seventh round.

First round 
The first round qualifiers for the regional league of Grand Est were organised separately by the three constituent sectors.

Alsace 
These matches were played on 6, 13, 14, 15, 16, 17, 19 and 20 June and 12 August 2018 in Alsace. Tiers shown reflect the 2017–18 season.

Champagne-Ardenne 
These matches were played on 9, 10, 17 and 24 June 2018 in Champagne-Ardenne. Tiers shown reflect the 2017–18 season.

Lorraine 
These matches were played on 2, 3, 8, 9, 10, 17 and 23 June and 12, 15 and 19 August 2018 in Lorraine. Tiers shown reflect the 2017–18 season.

Second round 
These matches were played on 12, 15, 18, 19, 26 and 29 August 2018 (with two replays played 9 and 12 September).

Third round 
These matches were played on 14, 15 and 16 September 2018.

Fourth round 
These matches were played on 29 and 30 September 2018.

Fifth round 
These matches were played on 29 and 30 September 2018.

Sixth round 
These matches were played on 27 and 28 October 2018.

References 

2018–19 Coupe de France